The 221st Military Intelligence Battalion, based at the Gillem Enclave in Forest Park, Georgia, is a major battalion in the 560th Battlefield Surveillance Brigade (United States) in the Army National Guard

Overview
The 221st Military Intelligence (MI) Battalion (BN) collects intelligence information in multiple intelligence disciplines to provide unit commanders intelligence for the battlefield and the focus of combat power. The organization also conducts intelligence production activities, ranging from intelligence preparation of the battlefield to situation development, signals intelligence, human intelligence, and counterintelligence support to Maneuver Commanders. The unit also has significant responsibilities in counterintelligence, human intelligence, force protection, and electronic warfare.

The 221st MI BN stated vision for operations includes: (1) collecting and providing relevant intelligence, security and information operations for U.S. Army, joint and combined forces; (2) leveraging national/theater/tactical equipment and capabilities of assigned personnel to provide relevant information reports to commanders at all echelons; (3) exploiting leading edge technology; and (4) meeting the challenge of today, tomorrow and the 21st Century.

Battalion Distinctive Unit Insignia
Distinctive Unit Insignia

Description
A silver color metal and enamel device 1 1/8 inches (2.86 cm) in height overall consisting of a shield blazoned: Per bend Argent and Gules a chess knight Sable surmounted by a sword bendwise sinister hilt to base Or; a bordure compony Azure (Oriental Blue) and Argent. Attached below the shield is a black and silver scroll inscribed "TRUTH THROUGH EXPLOITATION" in silver.

Symbolism
The colors oriental blue and silver gray represent the Military Intelligence Corps. The chess knight refers to the mission, which involves foresight and skillful planning. Its form, that of a horse, recalls the historic connection of Army Intelligence to Cavalry, which was the first organization to provide military intelligence services to the commander. The border alludes again to the chess-like strategic capabilities often important to the mission. The scarlet of the field recalls the flag of the battalion's home state, Georgia, and denotes courage. The sword indicates readiness and the will to fight. Together, scarlet, white and blue represent the United States. Black and gold signify respectively strength and excellence.

Background
The distinctive unit insignia was approved on 13 Apr 1999.

Commanders

Missions
The 221st MI BN has been involved in a number of missions since its inception.

Iraq (Operation Iraqi Freedom) 
In early May 2003, H Company (Long Range Surveillance) of the 221st provided 54 LRS infantrymen to the 203rd Military Intelligence Battalion (TECHINT) in support of foreign materials exploitation and WMD recovery missions. They accompanied almost every Joint Captured Material Exploitation Center collection mission providing security. On June 25, 2003, several LRS soldiers from the 221st were the first casualties of the technical intelligence mission in Iraq when they suffered non-life threatening injuries from a roadside IED attack on the 203rd.

KFOR 13
In April 2010, 221st MI BN mobilized and deployed 32 Soldiers as the KFOR 13 Analytical Control Element (ACE) in support of Multinational Division – East located at Camp Bondsteel.

KFOR 14
In December 2010, 221st MI BN mobilized and deployed 32 Soldiers as the KFOR 14 Analytical Control Element (ACE) in support of Multinational Division – East located at Camp Bondsteel.

KFOR 15
In August 2011, 221st MI BN mobilized and deployed Soldiers as the KFOR 15 Analytical Control Element (ACE) for a year-long deployment in support of Multinational Division – East located at Camp Bondsteel.

Afghanistan (Operation Enduring Freedom)
In January 2012, 221st MI BN mobilized and deployed the Black Knight OEF Task Force overseas to provide signal intelligence and human intelligence gathering capabilities to allied ground commanders in Afghanistan.

Subordinate Units

Headquarters & Headquarter Company

Alpha Company
Represents the Georgia National Guard's counter-intelligence agents, interrogators and linguists. Alpha Company was among the first Georgia Army National Guard units to deploy in February 2003 as part of Operation Iraqi Freedom.

Bravo Company
Represents the Georgia National Guard's counter-intelligence agents, interrogators and linguists. Bravo Company was among the first Georgia Army National Guard units to deploy in February 2003 as part of Operation Iraqi Freedom.

Charlie Company
Represents the Georgia National Guard's counter-intelligence agents, interrogators and linguists. Charlie Company was among the first Georgia Army National Guard units to deploy in February 2003 as part of Operation Iraqi Freedom.

References

External links 
Army National Guard
Georgia Army National Guard Website

Military Intelligence battalions of the United States Army